Berge Setrakian (born 14 April 1949, Beirut, Lebanon), is a lawyer and the current President of the Armenian General Benevolent Union (AGBU) since 2002.

Biography 
Setrakian has a Master Degrees in French and Comparative Laws and after practicing law for some years in Beirut, joined the law firm of Whitman & Ransom in the 1970s and now practices law as a Partner with the firm DLA Piper. 

Setrakian has served the AGBU in various leadership positions for many years and was elected member of the Central Board of Directors in 1977, and was from 1992 Vice President and Secretary during the presidency of Louise Manoogian Simone.

He was recognized with an Ellis Island Medal of Honor for his work on behalf of the Armenian-American community.

References

External links 
 Priorities, Opportunities and Challenges for Armenians lecture by Berge Setrakian at the American University of Armenia on January 30, 2015.
 Demystifying The Armenian Diaspora, an interview with Berge Setrakian on CivilNet TV (September 17, 2013).

1949 births
Lebanese people of Armenian descent
Living people
People from Beirut
Presidents of the Armenian General Benevolent Union
University of Lyon alumni
Lebanese University alumni
Saint Joseph University alumni
Armenian lawyers